"Un premier amour" ("A First Love") was the winning song of the Eurovision Song Contest 1962, sung in French by Isabelle Aubret representing .

The song was performed ninth on the night, following the ' De Spelbrekers with "Katinka" and preceding 's Inger Jacobsen with "Kom sol, kom regn". By the close of voting, it had received 26 points, placing it first in a field of 16.

The song is a typically dramatic ballad, with Aubret singing about the power that a first love has over people.

It was succeeded as French representative that year by Alain Barrière with "Elle était si jolie".

Eurovision Song Contest 1962 
This song was the French representation in the Eurovision Song Contest 1962. The orchestra was conducted by Franck Pourcel.

The song was performed 9th on the night of March 18, 1962 by Isabelle Aubret, preceded by the Netherlands with De Spelbrekers performing "Katinka" and followed by Norway with Inger Jacobsen performing "Kom sol, kom regn". The votes, the song had received 26 points, being in first place out of a total of 16 and declaring itself the winner.

Isabelle Aubret would represent France again in 1968 with the song "La source", which would come in third place.

It was succeeded as French representation at the 1963 Festival by Alain Barrière with "Elle était si jolie".

Sources and external links
 Official Eurovision Song Contest site, history by year, 1962
 Detailed info & lyrics, The Diggiloo Thrush, "Un premier amour".

References 

Eurovision songs of France
Eurovision songs of 1962
French-language songs
Eurovision Song Contest winning songs
Philips Records singles
1962 singles
1962 songs